Tylecodon reticulatus is a species of succulent plant in the genus Tylecodon belonging to the family Crassulaceae.

Description

Tylecodon reticulatus is a small to medium-sized, tree-like shrublet with a squat, basally normally solitary stem, up to 6 cm thick and 3–38 cm tall with a round sparsely branched crown to 30 cm in diameter with light brown bark peeling in strips. Young stems Tylecodon reticulatus subsp. phyllopodium have residual leaf bases (phyllopodia) which remain visible for several years. Leaves are crowded at branch tips, erect to ascending, 5–40 mm long and 3–10 mm tick, ovate, linear-lanceolate to liner-oblanceolate, glabrous to glandular-hairy, coloured from bluish-green to heavily pink-tinged. Inflorescences are finely branched thyrses to 7 cm tall and in diameter, with many dichasia each bearing 2–6 spreading to erect greenish yellow, tubular or swollen at base flowers, 6–8 mm long, 2.5 mm in diameter, laxly hairy, spreading and becoming recurved. The flowers persist after blossoming, so they form a dense reticulate crown above branches and leaves, hence the species name.

Distribution
Succulent Karoo, quartz gravel flats of South Namibia and RCA (Northern and Western Cape) .

Subspecies
 Tylecodon reticulatus subsp. phyllopodium (Harv.) Toelken — southern Namibia through to northern Namaqualand near Komaggas.
 Tylecodon reticulatus subsp. reticulatus — southern Namibia southwards to the western parts of RCA's Great Karoo towards Beaufort West and Graaf-Reinet.

References

 Bihrmann

Plants described in 1978
Flora of South Africa
Flora of Namibia
reticulatus
Taxa named by Hellmut R. Toelken